Dimitri Pavadé (born 14 August 1989) is a French para-athlete who specializes in long jump. He represented France at the 2020 Summer Paralympics.

Career
Pavadé represented France in the men's long jump T64 event at the 2020 Summer Paralympics and won a silver medal.

Personal life
Pavadé's right leg was amputated at the age of eighteen after a work accident. He was working on the docks in Réunion, France when a forklift truck, weighing 18 tonnes, rolled over his leg.

References

External links
 
 

1989 births
Living people
Paralympic athletes of France
French male long jumpers
Medalists at the World Para Athletics European Championships
Medalists at the World Para Athletics Championships
Athletes (track and field) at the 2020 Summer Paralympics
Medalists at the 2020 Summer Paralympics
Paralympic silver medalists for France
Paralympic medalists in athletics (track and field)
21st-century French people
20th-century French people